Schwarzsee (Zillertaler Alpen) is a lake of Tyrol, Austria.

Lakes of Tyrol (state)